Gainesville Regional Transit System is the local area transit corporation that serves the Gainesville, Alachua County, Florida area, the University of Florida and Santa Fe College campuses. It presently serves 40 city routes (19 on Saturdays, 16 on Sundays), 10 campus routes, and five "Later Gator" routes. Paratransit (ADA) service is also provided to anyone with a Gainesville address.

City routes

Campus Service
10 RTS routes operate on the University of Florida (UF) campus. These include "park and ride" and circulator routes.  UF and Santa Fe College (SF) students have prepaid unlimited access to RTS services through a transportation fee attached to each credit hour for undergraduates.  UF faculty, staff, spouses and retirees have unlimited prepaid access through the RTS Employee Bus Pass Program, as do SF faculty, staff and students.

Later Gator
Later Gator is a late night service that provides safe, late night service for students between campus, downtown, the Oaks Mall and southwest Gainesville through five routes.  This service has been cancelled with no clear future plans to return service to the routes.

Gator Aider
Gator Aider is a shuttle service provided to transport fans to and from University of Florida Gators home football games. Service is available at five park-n-ride locations around the Greater Gainesville area including the Town of Tioga, the Oaks Mall, Haile Plantation, the UF Hilton Conference Center and the City of Gainesville Downtown Parking Garage.

Bus Tracking
In 2008, RTS equipped their fleet with a GPS capability called TransLoc. This enables riders to see if their bus is running on time. TransLoc Rider, a mobile phone app that incorporates the TransLoc GPS capability, is also available for riders.

Fleet

Since 1974, Gainesville has had a diverse fleet of buses bought from Transit Authorities in state and manufacturers such as GMC, Orion Bus Industries, Blue Bird, Nova Bus, Flexible, Gillig Corporation. All RTS buses are equipped with bicycle racks and wheelchair lifts. While many were purchased new, others were acquired second-hand from other operators in the state, including 30 that were acquired from Lynx and 11 from Palm Tran. RTS acquired five new Gillig hybrid electric buses (two in early 2012 and three more in 2013).

Active Fleet
Gillig Phantom
Gillig Low Floor

Retired Fleet 
Nova Bus RTS

References

External links
 Gainesville RTS website 

1974 establishments in Florida
Bus transportation in Florida
Transit agencies in Florida
Transportation in Alachua County, Florida
Transportation in Gainesville, Florida
University of Florida